Pool of Twilight is a fantasy novel published by TSR, Inc. in November 1993. It is the third and final novel in the "Heroes of Phlan" novel trilogy, set in the Forgotten Realms setting for the Dungeons & Dragons role-playing game.

Plot summary

The conclusion of the "Pool" series. Kern, son of Shal and Tarl, and Daile, daughter of Ren, search for the missing Warhammer of Tyr, stolen by the god Bane at the end of the previous novel.

Reception
The book entered the USA Today Top 150 on October 28, 1993, and was on the USA Today Best-Selling Books list for 2 weeks, with #75 as its best week.

Reviews
Kliatt

References

1993 American novels
American fantasy novels
Forgotten Realms novels
Novels based on video games